Son of Pakistan is a 2011 Lollywood Urdu film written and directed by Jarrar Rizvi and released in summer 2011. It stars Sana Nawaz, Meera, Shamil Khan and Ghulam Mohiuddin, Baber Ali and Shafqat Cheema in the lead roles & Amna Zaheer (Daughter of Syed Zaheer Rizvi) as a Child Star daughter of Meera in the film.

Premise
Set in Pakistan, against the backdrop of the War on Terror and the prevalent consequences of the war stigmatizing Pakistan as a country that breeds and indoctrinates terrorism. The filmmakers intended Son of Pakistan to enlighten the masses and the world at large about Pakistan and its people against the backdrop of the War on Terror's consequences. The filmmakers intended to counter a negative prejudice about Pakistan and its people as terrorists — and to show their perspective that the people of Pakistan follow a peaceful way of life.

The movie tells the story of a dutiful police officer S.P. Islam who comes from a patriotic upbringing as does his brother. Son of Pakistan depicts uncertainty in the concept of patriotism while taking the protagonist's perspective of compassion towards his fellow citizens when he cannot be certain that everyone shares his beliefs. In a place of uncertainty being an enforcer of law where he comes across a potential terrorist every day, he can't trust anyone and has only himself to trust.

Cast
Ghulam Mohiuddin
Babar Ali
Shamil Khan
Meera
Amna Zaheer
Sana Nawaz
Sila Hussain
Amit Bhola Hansda
Shafqat Cheema

Release
The film was released on 16 December 2011.

Reception
Son of Pakistan mostly faced negative reviews. A critical review published in the Express Tribune stated "Son of Pakistan disappoints." There are some sources who praises the film, especially the director and producer for their courageous effort.

Soundtrack

References

External links

 
 coming-attractions

2011 films
Pakistani action films
2010s Urdu-language films
Insurgency in Khyber Pakhtunkhwa fiction
Films scored by Wajid Nashad
Military of Pakistan in films